Charles Porion (1814–1908) was a French painter.

Early life
Charles Porion was born on 1 May 1814 in Amiens. He was trained by Michel Martin Drolling and Jean-Auguste-Dominique Ingres.

Career
Porion came second at the 1840 Prix de Rome. He exhibited at the Salon from 1844 to 1868, where he won a bronze medal in 1844. He became a knight of the Légion d'Honneur in 1884.

Notes

References

1814 births
1868 deaths
People from Amiens
19th-century French painters
French male painters
19th-century French male artists